Angels Cry is the debut album of Brazilian metal band Angra. It was released in 1993 and recorded in Germany at Kai Hansen's studios in Hamburg.

The opening track is a short rendition of the first movement of Franz Schubert's "Symphony No. 8", commonly known as his "Unfinished Symphony". In addition, the title track features a brief arrangement of "Caprice no. 24" by Niccolò Paganini, whereas "Evil Warning" features a brief arrangement of "Winter" by Antonio Vivaldi. The opening of the track "Never Understand" features a brief arrangement of the song "Asa Branca" by Luiz Gonzaga. The opening section of the closing track "Lasting Child", entitled "The Parting Words", is an adaptation of the theme of Felix Mendelssohn's "Variations sérieuses", Op. 54.

Production and recording
When commenting on the production and recording of the album, vocalist Andre Matos said that recording the album was difficult due to the inexperience of him and his bandmates, and also due to the difference of musical influences between them and the producers. He also referred to the recording as "an exile":

Producer Charlie Bauerfeind was not confident that drummer and co-founder Marcos Antunes would be skillful enough for the music he expected to put in the album, so he told the band they could either fire him and hire Alex Holzwarth as a session musician or use electronic drums - or otherwise he would leave the project. The band decided to do as he said and replaced Antunes with Holzwarth, a decision Matos regards as being very difficult.

One of the songs, however, was performed by a different drummer: Kate Bush cover "Wuthering Heights", played by then Gamma Ray drummer Thomas Nack. Matos said Nack was a big fan of Bush and "could play those lines perfectly".

The inlays and photo shoots for the album display drummer Ricardo Confessori, but he would only join the band after its recording. Antunes appears on the back sleeve and inlays of the Japanese first press of the album instead of Confessori.

Track listing

Personnel

Band members
André Matos – lead vocals, keyboards, piano
Kiko Loureiro – lead and rhythm guitars
Rafael Bittencourt – rhythm and lead guitars
Luís Mariutti - bass guitar

Guest musicians
Alex Holzwarth – drums, percussion except in Track #7
Dirk Schlächter – lead guitar in Track #6
Kai Hansen – lead guitar in Track #6
Sascha Paeth – acoustic and lead guitars  in Track #6

Additional musicians
Thomas Nack – drums in track #7

References

1993 debut albums
Angra (band) albums
Polydor Records albums
Albums produced by Charlie Bauerfeind